Tanichthys thacbaensis is a species of freshwater fish. It is a member of the carp family (family Cyprinidae) of order Cypriniformes.  It is native to Vietnam.

References 

thacbaensis
Fish described in 2001